Neal Antone Dyer better known by the stage name Tony T. is a British singer, rapper and DJ of Jamaican origin, best known as the frontman of German dance music projects Beat System, Cascada, and R.I.O. His best known hit with R.I.O. was "Turn This Club Around", which reached number 3 in German Singles Chart and topped the Swiss Schweizer Hitparade chart, and was certified gold in both charts.

Beginnings
Born to Jamaican parents, he resided early on in Brooklyn where he started DJing. After two years, he moved to Germany in 1985 where he worked as a resident DJ at the club Gaslight.

1986–1998: Beat System
Starting 1986, he appeared in various projects under the name Beat System starting with "Noise Dance", a limited release in Germany. In the early 1990s came the singles "Dance Romance" and "Dance Romance Chapter Two" on Insania Records written by C. Kowatsch und Wormit and "Stay with Me" produced by Axel Breitung. Changing labels and signing with Blow Up and release of "Fresh" a cover of Kool & The Gang song that charted in Germany, followed by "Reggae Night", a cover of Jimmy Cliff. Intercord label released Beat System's debut and only album Refreshiator after which the project was dropped.

2008–2012: R.I.O.

In 2008 he was a founding member of the German dance project R.I.O with Yann Pfeifer (Yanou) and Manuel Reuter (DJ Manian). After the debut single "De Janeiro / R.I.O.", the trio with Tony T. as frontman of the band had a string of hits in Germany, Austria and Switzerland, like "Shine On" from the Shine On (The Album), followed by "When the Sun Comes Down", "Hot Girl", "Like I Love You" and "Miss Sunshine". But R.I.O.'s hit "Turn This Club Around" featuring the vocals of U-Jean proved to be an international success reaching No. 5 in Austria, No. 3 in Germany, No. 1 in Switzerland also charting in the UK, Scotland, Netherlands, as well as Belgium, Canada. The band released same titled album Turn This Club Around with the further hit "Animal" from the album.

2012–: Solo career / DNGRS Crew

Tony T. left the R.I.O. project in 2012 to launch a solo career. His first solo releaser was "Way to Rio". He was featured in "Everybody" from Mike Candys also featuring Evelyn. He also had collaborations such as with Darius & Finlay in "Phenomenon" and with Soulwash featured in "No Games". In 2013, he was featured in the hit "Want U Now" by Ardian Bujupi, a finalist in the German music competition Deutschland sucht den Superstar and in "Beautiful Life" by Sasha Lopez also featuring Big Ali.

In May 2013, he co-founded DNGRS Crew with rappers Carlprit and Marlon B. Their first single together is "Dangerous" credited to DJ Mase vs DNGRS Crew and is released on Kontor Records.

In 2022 he teamed up with singer Iraj and they did a cover of “Truth Hurts”.

Discography

Albums
with Beat System
1996: Refreshiator
with R.I.O.
2008: Shine On (The Album)
2011: Sunshine
2011: Turn This Club Around

Singles
with Beat System

with R.I.O.

Featured in

2012: "No Games" (Soulwash feat. Tony T.)
2013: "Want U Now" (Ardian Bujupi feat. Tony T.)
2013: "Breaking the Ice" (Bodybangers feat. Tony T.)
2013: "Summer's Gone" (Sash! feat. Tony T.)
2017: "Color of Love" (Stephan F feat. Tony T.)

References

External links
 R.I.O Discogs page
 Tony T. Discogs page

Living people
English people of Jamaican descent
English male singers
Black British male rappers
Black British DJs
German people of Jamaican descent
British emigrants to Germany
Year of birth missing (living people)
Singers from London
Rappers from London
DJs from London